Adam Haslett (born December 24, 1970) is an American fiction writer and journalist. His debut short story collection, You Are Not a Stranger Here, and his second novel, Imagine Me Gone, were both finalists for both the Pulitzer Prize and the National Book Award. He has been awarded fellowships from the Guggenheim Foundation, the American Academy of Arts and Letters, and the American Academy in Berlin. In 2017, he won the Los Angeles Times Book Prize.

Early life 
Haslett was born in Rye, New York and raised in Massachusetts and Oxfordshire, England. After graduating from Wellesley High School, he went on to receive a B.A. in English from Swarthmore College, an M.F.A. in creative writing from Iowa Writers’ Workshop, and a J.D. from Yale University.

Career 
Haslett began his career as a writer with a fellowship at the Fine Arts Work Center in Provincetown, Massachusetts. He published his first short story, “Notes To My Biographer”, in Zoetrope Magazine. This is the first story in his debut collection, You Are Not A Stranger Here, which was a finalist for a Pulitzer Prize and a National Book Award and was a New York Times Bestseller. The book was noted chiefly for its depictions of mental illness and “masterly sense of character.”

In 2010, Haslett published his first novel, Union Atlantic, which centers on a conflict over a piece of land between a young banker and a retired school teacher who is offended by the banker's new mansion. The novel was finished the week that the 2008 financial crisis began, and is the portrait of the culture of impunity than led to the great recession. It was shortlisted for the Commonwealth Prize and received the Lambda Literary Award.

His second novel, Imagine Me Gone, was published in 2016. It depicts a family coping with the intergenerational consequences of the father and eldest son's struggles with depression and anxiety. It won the Los Angeles Times Book Prize and was a finalist for the Pulitzer Prize and the National Book Critics’ Circle Award. In 2019, Literary Hub named it one of the twenty best novels of the decade.

In his journalism, Haslett has written about American politics, the financial crisis, and a range of cultural topics including gay marriage in The New Yorker, Vogue, Esquire, The Financial Times, The Guardian, and The Nation, among others.

He has been a visiting professor at the Iowa Writers’ Workshop and Columbia University.

Bibliography

 You Are Not a Stranger Here, Nan A. Talese/Doubleday, 2002
 Union Atlantic, Nan A. Talese/Doubleday, 2010
 Imagine Me Gone, Little, Brown, 2016

Awards 

 2002 - New York Magazine Writer-of-the-Year Award winner
 2002 - National Book Award finalist for You Are Not a Stranger Here
 2003 - Pulitzer Prize finalist for You Are Not a Stranger Here
 2003 - PEN/L.L. Winship Award winner for You Are Not a Stranger Here
 2006 - PEN/Malamud Award winner for accomplishment in the short story form 
 2010 - The Commonwealth Prize finalist for Union Atlantic
 2011 - Lambda Literary Award winner for Union Atlantic
 2016 - National Book Award longlist for Imagine Me Gone
 2016 - Kirkus Prize finalist for Imagine Me Gone
 2017 - Pulitzer Prize finalist for Imagine Me Gone
 2017 - National Book Critics Circle Award finalist for Imagine Me Gone
 2017 - Los Angeles Times Book Award winner for Imagine Me Gone

References

External links
Official website

1970 births
Living people
American gay writers
Iowa Writers' Workshop alumni
Swarthmore College alumni
Yale Law School alumni
University of Iowa alumni
21st-century American novelists
American male novelists
Lambda Literary Award for Gay Fiction winners
PEN/Malamud Award winners
American LGBT novelists
American male short story writers
21st-century American short story writers
21st-century American male writers
21st-century LGBT people